Christopher John Crewther (born 6 August 1983) is an Australian politician. He was a Liberal Party of Australia member of the Australian House of Representatives from 2016 to 2019 before being elected to the Victorian State Parliament, representing the division of Mornington in 2022.

Early life and education
Crewther was born in Mitcham and went to school in Horsham and Murtoa.

After school, Crewther graduated with a Bachelor of Laws with Honours from the University of Canberra, with a Science Minor. 

Crewther then added a Graduate Diploma of Legal Practice, and two master's degrees in international law and diplomacy from the Australian National University, the latter in which he was awarded the James Ingram AO Prize for Excellence in Diplomatic Studies for achieving top student.

Career 
Professionally, Crewther has worked as an associate to then ACT Magistrate John Burns, as a lawyer in private practice, in policy and legal roles at the Commonwealth Department of Agriculture, in project management at AIATSIS, as an international lawyer through the United Nations at the Kosovo Property Agency, as an adviser to former Minister for Veterans' Affairs, Victorian Liberal Senator the Hon. Michael Ronaldson, as CEO of Mildura Development Corporation (now Mildura Regional Development), running his own business, and as Head of Strategic Partnerships for the Global Fund to End Modern Slavery.

Politics

Federal parliament
Crewther was the Liberal candidate for the outer regional/rural seat of Mallee in 2013, which has been held by the National Party since its establishment in 1949. Crewther was the first Liberal Party candidate to contest the electorate since 1993, reflecting the Liberal and National Parties agreement to not contest the same seat except on the retirement of a sitting member. Crewther achieved 27% of the primary vote but the seat was held by the National Party.

Crewther was subsequently elected to parliament in 2016 in the inner regional/outer metropolitan seat of Dunkley, winning the seat with a 1.43% margin on the retirement of long serving member Bruce Billson.

Following a speech to parliament in late 2016, Crewther established the Parliamentary Friendship Group for Tourette Syndrome as its Founding Chair.

Crewther was chair of the Australian Parliament's Foreign Affairs and Aid Sub-Committee, under the Joint Standing Committee on Foreign Affairs, Defence and Trade (JSCFADT). He chaired the Sub-Committee's 'Inquiry into establishing a Modern Slavery Act in Australia', tabling to Parliament the Sub-Committee's Interim Report in August 2017 and Final Report ('Hidden in Plain Sight') in December 2017, which led to Australia's Modern Slavery Act 2018.

Crewther was named amongst Assent Compliance's Global Top 100 Corporate Social Responsibility Influence Leaders for 2018 and awarded a Freedom Award from Anti-Slavery Australia in October 2019.

Crewther was also Chair of the Australian Coalition Government's Policy Committee on Home Affairs and Legal Affairs, and Chair of the Australian Parliament's Ukraine-Australia Parliamentary Friendship Group.

He was defeated at the 2019 election by Labor candidate Peta Murphy, after being disadvantaged by an electoral redistribution that made Dunkley notionally Labor, along with a 1.7% TPP swing to Labor.

Crewther ran again for Liberal Party preselection in Dunkley for the 2022 Federal Election, but was unsuccessful.

State parliament
In December 2021 Crewther defeated long-standing Member for Mornington David Morris to win preselection as the Liberal candidate for Mornington for the 2022 Victorian state election. Crewther went on to narrowly win the seat.

In his inaugural speech to the Victorian Parliament, Crewther spoke of his opposition to vaccine mandates, and advocated for the decriminalisation of drug use and a “HECS-based system for schools”.

In December 2022, Crewther was appointed as the Shadow Parliamentary Secretary for Justice and Corrections, and Liberal Party Whip in the Legislative Assembly.

Personal life

Crewther lives on the Mornington Peninsula and has two young children with his wife Grace. He has a mild form of Tourette's, which was diagnosed in his early 20s, and is Patron of the Tourette Syndrome Association of Australia.

Crewther has been a member of the Australian Government's Modern Slavery Expert Advisory Group, a non-executive director of Zoe Support Australia and Global Voices, and a member of several other committees.

References

 

1983 births
Living people
Liberal Party of Australia members of the Parliament of Australia
Members of the Australian House of Representatives for Dunkley
Members of the Australian House of Representatives
21st-century Australian politicians
People with Tourette syndrome
People from Horsham, Victoria
University of Canberra alumni
Australian National University alumni
Australian lawyers